OP9 may refer to:

OP9 cell, a cell line
Op. 9 (disambiguation), opus number 9, various musical compositions
Candidate phylum OP9, former name for Atribacteria